Serica tristis is a species of May beetle or junebug in the family Scarabaeidae.  It is found in North America.

References

Further reading

 
 
 

Melolonthinae